Abbey Grange Church of England Academy is a coeducational secondary school and sixth form with academy status, located in West Park, Leeds, West Yorkshire, England. It is the only Church of England secondary school in Leeds.

The school has 1,619 students as of November 2021 between the ages of 11 and 18, and 80 members of staff.

The school was awarded Humanities College status in 2006.

In August 2011 the school was changed into an Academy and is now known as 'Abbey Grange Church of England Academy'.
 
The school was judged Good by Ofsted in 2017.

Abbey Grange alumni include footballer Andre Wisdom, actor and comedian Nick Mohammed, and academic and Shakespearean Emma Smith.

References

External links

 School website
 School radio

Church of England secondary schools in the Diocese of Leeds
Secondary schools in Leeds
Academies in Leeds